The Fort Wayne Generals were a class-A minor league baseball, club based in Fort Wayne, Indiana. The defeated the Flint Arrows, in the league playoffs, however they were defeated by the Dayton Indians in the finals, 4 games to 2.

1948 season

References

Pittsburgh Pirates minor league affiliates
Professional baseball teams in Indiana
1948 establishments in Indiana
Baseball teams established in 1948
Sports clubs disestablished in 1948
Defunct baseball teams in Indiana
Defunct minor league baseball teams
1948 disestablishments in Indiana
Central League teams
Baseball teams disestablished in 1948
Sports in Fort Wayne, Indiana